Wooster Street is a street in SoHo and Greenwich Village in Manhattan, which runs south to north from Canal Street to Washington Square. It is a prime location for on-location filming and photo shoots due to its relatively low traffic, and the flagstone sidewalks and cobblestone street give it an old gritty feel. It is depicted as a night-time rainy street on the cover of the issue of The New Yorker dated February 8, 2021.

History 
The street is named after an American Revolutionary War General, David Wooster.  Duparquet, Huot & Moneuse held Nos. 24 and 26 early in the company's history.

The street is home to many boutiques, restaurants (including a branch of the Momofuku Milk Bar) and cultural institutions such as The Wooster Group, an experimental theater company based at the Performing Garage at 33 Wooster Street.

Notable residents
 Claire Danes and Hugh Dancy
 Whoopi Goldberg

References

Streets in Manhattan
SoHo, Manhattan
Lower Manhattan